Der Beck GmbH is a bakery chain founded in 1895.  It is one of the 4% of biggest German bakeries with more than 5 million Euros revenue and more than 140 dependences (as of 2014) in the metropolitan area of Nuremberg, owned today by  Petra und Siegfried Beck, grandchildren of the founder family Ziegler.

Awards 
 2006 Franconia's baker of the year (German: Frankens Bäcker des Jahres) 
 2006 Deutscher Kulturförderpreis, i.e. German development grant for culture, awarded by the Federal association of the German Industry (BDI).
 2009 Grand Prix of the small and medium-sized enterprises (German: Großer Preis des Mittelstandes) awarded by the Oskar Patzelt foundation
 2009 „Umweltpakt Bayern - Umweltverträgliches Wirtschaftswachstum“ awarded by the Bavarian ministry for environment and consumer Bayerischen Staatsministeriums für Umwelt und Gesundheit) 
 2010 Axia Award in the category human resources (German: Personalmanagement)

References

1895 establishments in Germany
Food and drink companies of Germany
Companies based in Bavaria